Hitesh Basumatary is an Asom Gana Parishad politician from Assam. He has been elected in Assam Legislative Assembly election in 2011 from Chapaguri constituency. In 2016, he joined the United People's Party Liberal ahead of the Assam election in 2016.

References 

Living people
Asom Gana Parishad politicians
Assam MLAs 2011–2016
People from Baksa district
Year of birth missing (living people)
Bodoland People's Front politicians
United People's Party Liberal politicians